Novalena is a genus of North American and Caribbean funnel weavers first described by R. V. Chamberlin & Wilton Ivie in 1942.

Species
 it contains fifty-three species:

N. ajusco Maya-Morales & Jiménez, 2017 – Mexico
N. alamo Maya-Morales & Jiménez, 2017 – Mexico
N. alvarezi Maya-Morales & Jiménez, 2017 – Mexico
N. annamae (Gertsch & Davis, 1940) – Mexico
N. approximata (Gertsch & Ivie, 1936) – Mexico, Costa Rica
N. attenuata (F. O. Pickard-Cambridge, 1902) – Mexico, Guatemala
N. atzimbo Maya-Morales & Jiménez, 2017 – Mexico
N. bipartita (Kraus, 1955) – El Salvador
N. bipunctata Roth, 1967 – Mexico, Trinidad
N. bosencheve Maya-Morales & Jiménez, 2017 – Mexico
N. calavera Chamberlin & Ivie, 1942 – USA
N. chamberlini Maya-Morales & Jiménez, 2017 – Mexico
N. cieneguilla Maya-Morales & Jiménez, 2017 – Mexico
N. cintalapa Maya-Morales & Jiménez, 2017 – Mexico
N. clara Maya-Morales & Jiménez, 2017 – Mexico
N. comaltepec Maya-Morales & Jiménez, 2017 – Mexico
N. costata (F. O. Pickard-Cambridge, 1902) – Costa Rica
N. creel Maya-Morales & Jiménez, 2017 – Mexico
N. dentata Maya-Morales & Jiménez, 2017 – Mexico
N. divisadero Maya-Morales & Jiménez, 2017 – Mexico
N. durango Maya-Morales & Jiménez, 2017 – Mexico
N. franckei Maya-Morales & Jiménez, 2017 – Mexico
N. garnica Maya-Morales & Jiménez, 2017 – Mexico
N. gibarrai Maya-Morales & Jiménez, 2017 – Mexico
N. intermedia (Chamberlin & Gertsch, 1930) – Canada, USA
N. irazu Maya-Morales & Jiménez, 2017 – Costa Rica
N. iviei Maya-Morales & Jiménez, 2017 – Mexico
N. ixtlan Maya-Morales & Jiménez, 2017 – Mexico
N. jiquilpan Maya-Morales & Jiménez, 2017 – Mexico
N. laticava (Kraus, 1955) – El Salvador
N. leonensis Maya-Morales & Jiménez, 2017 – Mexico
N. lutzi (Gertsch, 1933) – USA
N. mexiquensis Maya-Morales & Jiménez, 2017 – Mexico
N. oaxaca Maya-Morales & Jiménez, 2017 – Mexico
N. orizaba (Banks, 1898) – Mexico
N. paricutin Maya-Morales & Jiménez, 2017 – Mexico
N. perote Maya-Morales & Jiménez, 2017 – Mexico
N. plata Maya-Morales & Jiménez, 2017 – USA
N. poncei Maya-Morales & Jiménez, 2017 – Mexico
N. popoca Maya-Morales & Jiménez, 2017 – Mexico
N. prieta Maya-Morales & Jiménez, 2017 – Mexico
N. puebla Maya-Morales & Jiménez, 2017 – Mexico
N. punta Maya-Morales & Jiménez, 2017 – Mexico
N. rothi Maya-Morales & Jiménez, 2017 – USA
N. saltoensis Maya-Morales & Jiménez, 2017 – Mexico
N. shlomitae (García-Villafuerte, 2009) – Mexico
N. simplex (F. O. Pickard-Cambridge, 1902) – Mexico, Guatemala
N. sinaloa Maya-Morales & Jiménez, 2017 – Mexico
N. tacana Maya-Morales & Jiménez, 2017 – Mexico, Guatemala
N. triunfo Maya-Morales & Jiménez, 2017 – Mexico
N. valdezi Maya-Morales & Jiménez, 2017 – Mexico
N. victoria Maya-Morales & Jiménez, 2017 – Mexico
N. volcanes Maya-Morales & Jiménez, 2017 – Mexico

References

External links

 

Agelenidae
Araneomorphae genera
Spiders of North America